John Anthony Tucknott  (born 2 January 1958) is a British diplomat.

He was educated at Bournemouth School and King's College London (MA, International Studies) and served as British Ambassador to Nepal from 2010 to 2013; as British Deputy High Commissioner to Pakistan and Director Trade and Investment Pakistan  from 2013 - 2016; and as British Deputy Ambassador to Iraq from 2017 until September 2020. He is a UK Trade Champion.

Tucknott was appointed Companion of the Order of St Michael and St George (CMG) in the 2020 New Year Honours for services to British foreign policy.

References

1958 births
Living people
People educated at Bournemouth School
Alumni of King's College London
Ambassadors of the United Kingdom to Nepal
Members of the Order of the British Empire
British expatriates in Pakistan
Companions of the Order of St Michael and St George